Moritz Makes his Fortune is a 1931 German comedy film directed by Jaap Speyer and starring Sig Arno, Viktor Schwanneke, and Willy Prager.

Cast

See also
 The Levy Department Stores (French version, 1932)

References

Bibliography

External links

1931 films
1931 comedy films
German comedy films
Films of the Weimar Republic
1930s German-language films
Films directed by Jaap Speyer
German black-and-white films
German multilingual films
1931 multilingual films
1930s German films